The Ven  Evan James Gwyn Rogers (14 January 1914 – 30 March 1982)  was Archdeacon of Doncaster from 1967  to 1979.

He was educated at  St David's College, Lampeter and Wycliffe Hall, Oxford;  and ordained Deacon in 1937 and Priest in 1938. After curacies in Walmersley and Rochdale he held incumbencies in  Wigan and Coniston Cold.

References

1914 births
Alumni of the University of Wales, Lampeter
Alumni of Wycliffe Hall, Oxford
Archdeacons of Doncaster
1982 deaths